Kerstin Knabe ( Claus, born 7 July 1959 in Oschatz, Bezirk Leipzig) is a former German athlete, who ran for East Germany. She made her Olympic debut at the 1980 Games, placing 4th in the 100m hurdles. Knabe did not participate in the 1984 Olympic Games in Los Angeles because of a boycott of those Games by East Germany.

Achievements

References

1959 births
Living people
People from Oschatz
People from Bezirk Leipzig
East German female hurdlers
Sportspeople from Saxony
Olympic athletes of East Germany
Athletes (track and field) at the 1980 Summer Olympics
Athletes (track and field) at the 1988 Summer Olympics
World Athletics Championships medalists
European Athletics Championships medalists
World Athletics Championships athletes for East Germany